Mohammad Rizwan is an Indian politician and a member of the 16th Legislative Assembly of Uttar Pradesh of India. He represents the Kundarki constituency of Uttar Pradesh and is a member of the Samajwadi Party.

Early life and education
Mohammad Rizwan was born in Moradabad district, Uttar Pradesh. He holds a bachelor's degree from Kedar Nath Girdharilal Khatri PG College in Moradabad. Before being elected as MLA, he used to work as an agriculturist.

Political career
Mohammad Rizwan has been a MLA for three terms. He represented the Kundarki constituency during his terms and is a member of the Samajwadi Party.

On 3 February 2016, police filed a case against Rizwan and his two sons for assaulting a Block Development Committee member and stealing Rs. crore 22,000.

Posts Held

See also
Kundarki
Politics of India
Sixteenth Legislative Assembly of Uttar Pradesh
Uttar Pradesh Legislative Assembly

References 

Samajwadi Party politicians
Uttar Pradesh MLAs 2002–2007
Uttar Pradesh MLAs 2012–2017
Uttar Pradesh MLAs 2017–2022
People from Moradabad district
1953 births
Living people